NetSys International (Pty) Ltd. is a South African–based company, specialising in solutions  for the weather and aviation industries.

History
The company was registered in 1981 as a private company (Company registration no: 1981/02825/07).

NetSys was founded for the purpose of developing network communications equipment and automatic message switching systems. The first customer was the South African Defence Force which ordered a logistics network comprising some 50 nodes of proprietary networking devices. The experience gained during this deployment was instrumental in entering into the international market. In 1988, NetSys was awarded a contract by the American computer company, Control Data Corporation, to develop a meteorological message-switching system on the back of the NetSys network devices. This development and subsequent investment in aviation related product development enabled NetSys to become a major solutions supplier in the Meteorological and Aviation industries.

Since the work done for Control Data Corporation, NetSys has won a selection of tenders from a number of prestigious organisations. The main product was Weatherman, a message switch tailored for effective management of weather reports. In 1996 NetSys entered into the new area of Aviation with the commissioning of an automated Met and AIS pilot briefing system in Sweden, under the system name of Met/AIS. Isak Lombard, an executive director of NetSys, also joined NetSys in 1996 to become part of the Met/AIS team. The Met/AIS system became FlightMan that was subsequently acquired by aviation authorities in many other countries.

NetSys International, in a strategic move to ensure that it remained a leader in its chosen fields, sought ISO Accreditation during 1998, achieving this goal on 29 March 1999 when NetSys received its ISO 9001 Accreditation Certificate from DEKRA – ITS Certification Services (Pty) Ltd.

In another strategic move, NetSys decided in 2001 to supply commercial off the shelf (COTS) hardware for its system solutions – Cisco Systems for synchronous connections and Wide Area Network interfaces, 3Com for Local Area Network connections, Digi for asynchronous ports, Hewlett-Packard and Dell for server hardware are given preference when proposing new deals.

In 2003, NetSys decided to consolidate its applications under one umbrella user-interface to provide a consistent look-and-feel for a diverse set of applications and different types of users. The solution was based on a client-server architecture where much of the existing proven server software (NSSRV) are re-used but exposed in modern client software (NSWS). This new solution is called the NetSys Solutions approach, where necessary elements from the server and client software are chosen and utilised to create a best-fit solution for the customer's needs.

NetSys entered a new development direction in 2004 with the creation of its NOTAM management software. This system is currently in operation in Taiwan.

Origin of the name
NetSys was founded as Network Systems. The name was changed in 1988 to a shorter form, Netsys International, and finally in 2004 by the managing director of the time, to NetSys International.
In 1993, Netsys UK was registered to act as the NetSys UK representative.

Meteorological communication centres/Regional telecommunication hubs
NetSys has a number of users that falls into this category. These users are typically responsible for the ingestion and dissemination of weather data. They provide a service to their clients by selectively distributing data based on routing tables. The routing tables are based on the WMO headers, or it may be AFTN send groups and addresses. Such a communication centre normally has a number of data sources and destinations which may support a variety of protocols. The product that is traditionally used is WeatherMan. More recent users use the NSSRV MHS with the modern NSWS Control Centre.

The NetSys software fulfills the needs of a Regional Telecommunications Hub (RTH), as specified by the World Meteorological Organization (WMO). In this category NetSys has its message switching software in South Africa (Pretoria), India (Delhi), Hungary (Budapest), Switzerland (Zurich) and Poland (Warsaw).

Another sub-category of these users are those responsible for message communication but more under the auspices of the International Civil Aviation Authority (ICAO). These users are typically connected to the AFTN for the reception and transmission of MET data. The CoreMet system of UK NATS at the Heathrow communication centre is an example of such a site. This system is also responsible for the data quality and the uplink of all OPMET data disseminated over the SADIS satellite broadcast. In this regard, WeatherMan is used extensively to automatically correct systematic errors and rejected messages are sent to the NSWS Control Centre for manual correction with the aid of system provided diagnostics and hints.

Another category of software that is used by NATS for example is the NSWS Met Data Monitor. It is used to monitor the timely arrival of data from different locations. Late arrivals are displayed on a dynamic map and with this functionality NATS can very quickly identify regional communication breakdowns around the globe. It also broadcasts reports of late arrivals as administrative messages to SADIS users, thus applying some peer pressure for performance improvement.

Data banks
It might be required by international organisations that some countries provide international and local data banks of OPMET or NOTAM. Examples of which are the European OPMET databanks in Brussels and Vienna, and EAD at Eurocontrol. The NetSys systems at BelgoControl are responsible for providing the Brussels databank.

Flight information services/Flight planning centres
Certain civil aviation authorities put a high value on quality and personalised pre-flight briefing. They require a system that will automatically deliver pre-flight bulletins where it is needed: e-mailed, faxed or delivered on paper. Each bulletin is tailor made from the flight route, derived from the flight plan. A typical requirement is to provide the most essential information possible, not to overload the cockpit with unnecessary paper and irrelevant data. For this purpose, these types of users normally require a narrow route briefing, where only information that touches or overlaps a flight corridor is included. An example of an excellent flight briefing service is the FPC at Arlanda in Sweden. A perfect product for such a customer is NSWS Flight Briefing with the necessary NSSRV components added as required, e.g. fax drivers. Legal records of all delivered flight briefings are also kept to provide an exact history. This may be crucial during an accident investigation.

Large airports
Many airports require a larger and integrated system. Normally this involves connecting a number of fringe systems and centralising data collection and distribution, the display of CCTV screens at control towers, processing of runway instrumentation output (e.g. RVR and wind) and much more. Here NetSys has the ability to use its NSSRV MHS to centralise the collection of data and distribute it in a controlled manner to all client systems. It allows a centralised archiving function that becomes crucial during accident investigations. NetSys can also integrate many data formats and massage them to fit the client's needs. An example is the special message format requirements for ATIS or VOLMET systems as implement in Belgium and India for example. NetSys developed one of the first interfaces to an AMHS to exchange meteorological data using the X.400 protocol.

Remote airports
There are many airports that do not have their own forecasters or a proper infrastructure to link them with forecasting centres but that need to supply pilots with weather briefings. This is a potential larger market but with relatively low margin and project costs. NSWS WAFS together with a satellite receiver for SADIS or ISCS is used in this scenarios. NetSys has many such small sites, many of which have been sponsored by IATA or managed by ICAO. Examples of current sites include Saudi Arabia, Oman, Ecuador, Mongolia, Afghanistan and China. NSWS WAFS displays the WAFS data and allows the user to produce Meteorological briefings.

Aviation forecasting
Some civil aviation authorities have a meteorological department that provide local weather forecasting. An example is BelgoControl in Belgium, where the organisation has a number of forecasters that produce local forecasts specifically for aviation customers such as airlines, freight operators and private pilots. NetSys also maintains a climate database for BelgoControl in which SYNOP, METAR and TAF messages for selected stations are decoded up to element level and stored for research and quality control purposes. TAMC in Taiwan is another example of a user that produces its own SIGWX charts with NSWS Forecaster.

Flight information centres/NOTAM Offices
There are many NOTAM offices in the world that still use a paper system to manage the NOTAM. The lack of computerisation is because of the wide deviation from NOTAM standards, as well as the high importance of this data. Contrary to Met data, NOTAM data volumes are low but each is of high importance. Carefully assigned sequence numbers guard the integrity of the data base. This market is potentially huge but faces its own challenges. Integration with an AIP is essential should one want to fully utilise FPL routes. NetSys can offer our NSWS NOTAM product specifically for NOTAM offices and our NSWS Flight Briefing for customers that require extended flight briefing.

Major customer installations
Including the major sites listed below, NetSys provides customer support in over 17 countries around the world.

 SMI in Zurich, Switzerland
 LFV in Stockholm, Sweden
 NATS at Heathrow in London, United Kingdom
 IMD in Delhi, Kolkatta, Mumbai and Chennai, India
 Belgocontrol in Brussels, Belgium
 IM at Lisbon and Islands, Portugal
 ANWS in Taipei, Taiwan
 SAWS in Pretoria, South Africa
 ATMB in Beijing, Shanghai and Guangzhou, China

Environment of South Africa
Information technology companies of South Africa
Companies based in the City of Tshwane
Organisations based in Pretoria